Jeff Schmedding (born January 19, 1978) is an American football coach who is currently the defensive coordinator at Washington State University. He most recently served as the defensive coordinator and assistant head coach at Auburn University. He has previously served as the defensive coordinator for Boise State University.

Coaching career
Schmedding began his coaching career as a graduate assistant at his alma mater Eastern Washington. Schmedding would serve numerous roles for the team including coaching special teams, safeties and linebackers before becoming the defensive coordinator for Eastern Washington in 2015. In 2019, he was hired by Bryan Harsin to serve as the defensive coordinator for Boise State. In 2021, when Harsin left Boise State for Auburn, he hired Schmedding to coach linebackers. In 2022, Schmedding was named Auburn's defensive coordinator following the departure of Derek Mason.  Schmedding also served as Auburn's assistant head coach.  Following Bryan Harsin's firing from Auburn midway through the 2022 season, Schmedding was the lone assistant brought by Harsin to Auburn that was retained by interim head coach Cadillac Williams. Upon the hiring of Hugh Freeze it was announced that Schmedding would not be retained by Auburn. In January 2023, Schmedding was named defensive coordinator at Washington State.

Personal life
Schmedding is married and has two sons.

References

External links
 Auburn Profile

1978 births
Living people
Auburn Tigers football coaches
Boise State Broncos football coaches
Eastern Washington Eagles football coaches
Coaches of American football from Washington (state)